Gaëlle Widmer (born 24 December 1977) is a Swiss former professional tennis player.

Biography
Widmer, a left-handed player from Neuchâtel, reached a best ranking on tour of 238 in the world.

Her career included a Fed Cup appearance for Switzerland in 2005, when she and Stefanie Vögele were beaten by Austria's Klemenschits twins in a World Group Playoff doubles rubber.

She won a total of five ITF singles titles, before retiring in 2007.

ITF Circuit finals

Singles: 10 (5 titles, 5 runner-ups)

Doubles: 2 (2 runner-ups)

See also
 List of Switzerland Fed Cup team representatives

References

External links
 
 
 

1977 births
Living people
Swiss female tennis players
People from Neuchâtel
Sportspeople from the canton of Neuchâtel